In the mathematical field of graph theory, the Chvátal graph is an undirected graph with 12 vertices and 24 edges, discovered by .

It is triangle-free: its girth (the length of its shortest cycle) is four. It is 4-regular: each vertex has exactly four neighbors. And its chromatic number is 4: it can be colored using four colors, but not using only three. It is, as Chvátal observes, the smallest possible 4-chromatic 4-regular triangle-free graph; the only smaller 4-chromatic triangle-free graph is the Grötzsch graph, which has 11 vertices but has maximum degree 5 and is not regular.

This graph is not vertex-transitive: its automorphism group has one orbit on vertices of size 8, and one of size 4.

By Brooks’ theorem, every k-regular graph (except for odd cycles and cliques) has chromatic number at most k. It was also known since  that, for every k and l there exist k-chromatic graphs with girth l. In connection with these two results and several examples including the Chvátal graph,
 conjectured that for every k and l there exist k-chromatic k-regular graphs with girth l. The Chvátal graph solves the case k = l = 4 of this conjecture. Grünbaum's conjecture was disproven for sufficiently large k by Johannsen (see ), who showed that the chromatic number of a triangle-free graph is O(Δ/log Δ) where Δ is the maximum vertex degree and the O introduces big O notation. However, despite this disproof, it remains of interest to find examples such as the Chvátal graph of high-girth k-chromatic k-regular graphs for small values of k.

An alternative conjecture of  states that high-degree triangle-free graphs must have significantly smaller chromatic number than their degree, and more generally that a graph with maximum degree Δ and maximum clique size ω must have chromatic number

The case ω = 2 of this conjecture follows, for sufficiently large Δ, from Johanssen's result. The Chvátal graph shows that the rounding up in Reed's conjecture is necessary, because for the Chvátal graph, (Δ + ω + 1)/2 = 7/2, a number that is less than the chromatic number but that becomes equal to the chromatic number when rounded up.

The Chvátal graph is Hamiltonian, and plays a key role in a proof by  that it is NP-complete to determine whether a triangle-free Hamiltonian graph is 3-colorable.

The independence number of this graph is 4.

Gallery

References

.
.
.
.
.
.

External links

Individual graphs
Regular graphs